Blånibba or Gjegnet or Uksen is the highest mountain in the municipality of Bremanger in Vestland county, Norway. The glacier Gjegnalundsbreen lies directly to the east of the mountain.

Names
The name Gjegnen is a definite noun derived from the adjective gjegn which means "straight" or "direct". The top of this prominent mountain was used to find and hold the direction for travellers.  The alternate name Blånibba is a compound of the words blå ("blue") and the definite form of nibbe (mountain peak).

See also
List of mountains of Norway
Hornelen Basin

References

Mountains of Vestland
Bremanger